= DJ Row =

Greek-American disc jockey

- Born: Nikos Fousias; May 7, 1983 (age 42); Chicago, Illinois
- Origin: Samos, Greece
- Genres: Trance, Progressive
- Years active: 2000–present
- Website: http://www.djrow.com

DJ Row, also known as Nikos Fousias, is a Greek American dance DJ.

== Biography ==
Fousias won the award for best South East European Trance DJ in June 2008. He was ranked in The DJ List 81st in 2011, 69th in 2010 (which was his highest rank so far), 78th for 2009 & 84th for 2008 among over 210,000 DJs worldwide and also at the TOP-200 2 times so far, 195th in 2007 and 198th in 2005. He was also 315th in 2006. For the past 3 years has been in the top 3 spots for Greece.

== Discography ==
Singles:

- "Colossus" (2008)
- "Wide Awake" (2008)
- "Night Shift" (2010)
- "See Inside" – Niko Pavlidis Feat. ROW (2013)

Remixes:

- Polycat – No More (Row Remix) (2008)
- Inphinity feat Ana Herrero – True Faith (Row Vocal/Dub/Instrumental Mix) (2008)
- Cosmic Gate – Flatline (Row Remix) (2009)
